The 1970 U.S. Pro Tennis Championships was a men's tennis tournament played on outdoor hard courts at the Longwood Cricket Club in Boston, USA. It was classified as a Glass 1 category tournament and was part of the 1970 Grand Prix circuit. It was the 43rd edition of the tournament and was held from August 3 through August 9, 1970. Fourth-seeded Tony Roche won the singles title and the accompanying $12,000 first prize money.

Seeds
Champion seeds are indicated in bold text while text in italics indicates the round in which those seeds were eliminated.

Draw

Finals

Top half

Bottom half

References

U.S. Pro Tennis Championships
Singles